The  was a nationalist political society in late 1920s and early 1930s Japan.

History
The Kokuhonsha was founded in 1924 by conservative Minister of Justice and President of the House of Peers, Kiichirō Hiranuma. It called on Japanese patriots to reject the various foreign political “-isms” (such as socialism, communism, Marxism, anarchism, etc.) in favor of a rather vaguely defined “Japanese national spirit” (kokutai). The name “kokuhon” was selected as an antithesis to the word “minpon”, from minpon shugi, the commonly used translation for the word “democracy”, and the society was openly supportive of totalitarian ideology. The elder statesman Saionji Kinmochi publicly criticized the organization of promoting Japanese fascism.

Membership of the Kokuhonsha included many of Hiranuma's colleagues from the Ministry of Home Affairs, important businessmen, as well as some of the most powerful generals and admirals, including generals Sadao Araki, Jinzaburō Masaki, Makoto Saitō, and Yamakawa Kenjirō with war hero and admiral Tōgō Heihachirō serving as honorary Vice Chairman. By 1936, it claimed to have a membership of over 200,000 in 170 branches. The Kokuhonsha published a newspaper, and acted as Hiranuma's political support group.

However, after Hiranuma was appointed President of the Privy Council, he no longer needed the support of a political action group. The February 26 Incident of 1936, during which time many prominent members expressed support for the insurrectionists, provided Hiranuma with an excuse to order the organization dissolved.

See also
List of Japanese nationalist movements and parties

References

Notes

1924 establishments in Japan
1936 disestablishments in Japan
Politics of the Empire of Japan
Political organizations based in Japan
Japanese nationalism